Immanuel-Johannes Pherai (born 25 April 2001) is a Dutch professional footballer who plays as a midfielder for German  club Eintracht Braunschweig.

Club career
Pherai was loaned from Borussia Dortmund to PEC Zwolle on 17 September 2020. He made his professional debut for Zwolle in the Eredivisie two days later, coming on as a substitute in the 76th minute for Jesper Drost against AZ, with the match finishing as a 1–1 away draw.

Ahead of the 2021–22 season, Pherai returned to Dortmund, and scored on his Borussia Dortmund II debut, a 2–1 win vs. FSV Zwickau. He made his Bundesliga debut for the main Borussia squad on 7 May 2022 in a 3–1 victory against Greuther Fürth, substituting Marco Reus in added time.

On 22 June 2022, Pherai signed a two-year contract with Eintracht Braunschweig in 2. Bundesliga.

International career
Pherai has appeared for the Netherlands under-15 to under-19 national teams.

Personal life
Pherai was born in Amsterdam, and is of Surinamese descent.

References

External links
 
 
 
 
 

2001 births
Living people
Dutch sportspeople of Surinamese descent
Dutch footballers
Footballers from Amsterdam
Association football midfielders
Netherlands youth international footballers
Eredivisie players
Tweede Divisie players
Bundesliga players
2. Bundesliga players
3. Liga players
Jong AZ players
Borussia Dortmund players
Borussia Dortmund II players
PEC Zwolle players
Eintracht Braunschweig players
Dutch expatriate footballers
Dutch expatriate sportspeople in Germany
Expatriate footballers in Germany